Smritivan Earthquake Memorial and Museum is a memorial park dedicated to the victims of 2001 Gujarat earthquake and museum on Bhujiyo Hill in Bhuj,  Kutch district, Gujarat, India. It has seven blocks with displays on seven different themes.

History
The memorial park dedicated to the victims of 2001 Gujarat earthquake and celebrating resilience of people of Kutch along with a museum was proposed in 2004 by Gujarat State Disaster Management Authority. The architect for the memorial and museum was Vastu-Shilpa Consultants while exhibits were designed by Design Factory India. It was inaugurated on 28 August 2022 by Prime Minister Narendra Modi.

Features
There are more than 13000 trees, each dedicated to a victim, planted in the park. There are 50 check dams, a sunset point, 8 km-long pathways, 1.2 km-long internal roads, 1 MW solar power plant and parking space for 3,000 people.

These blocks features seven themes: Rebirth, Rediscover, Restore, Rebuild, Rethink, Relive and Renew.

See also 

 Veer Balak Smarak

References

Museums in Gujarat
Local museums in India
Museums established in 2022
2022 establishments in Gujarat
Tourist attractions in Kutch district
Bhuj
Memorial parks